Lloyd's Botanical Garden, or Darjeeling Botanical Garden, is a botanical garden in Darjeeling in the Indian state of West Bengal.

History
Lloyd's Botanical Garden was established in 1878 when  of land was acquired at Darjeeling to form a botanic garden as a distant annexe of the Calcutta Botanical Garden. The land was provided by William Lloyd, in whose name the botanical garden has been named.

Location 
This Garden is one of the main attractions to the visitors to Darjeeling with a treasury of many rare and beautiful plants as well as patches of typical forest of tall Cryptomeria, Bucklandia and Alnus with thick mass of lianas and shrubby undergrowth. It is a favorite spot of recreation with vistas across some of the loveliest slopes, a paradise to the students and research workers in Botany and an eminent institution distributing the plants and seeds and specimens of temperate and sub-temperate Himalayas to different parts of the world.

Approach 
The botanical garden has four gates. Gate No:1 ( Iron Gate or Loachnagar gate) is approachable from the taxi stand. The road is very steep but shorter than the other approaches. Vehicles can reach this gate, but there is no parking facility. Gate No:2 (Staff gate) can be approached from the Sadar Police Station. This path is through the settlements and is narrow and can be reached on foot only. The road will lead to the staff quarters and a flight of stairs will lead to Gate No:2.Approaching Gate No:2 on foot is comparatively easier than reaching other gates on foot. Gate No:3 (Chandmari gate) can be reached through Haro Ghose road which passes through the bazaar. Vehicles can reach this gate, but no parking is available. Gate No:4 (Victoria gate) is on the Victoria road and provides entry for visitors entering from the Western side.

Collections
The Darjeeling Botanical Garden preserves several species of bamboo, oak, magnolia, arisaema, cotoneaster, wild geranium, and rhododendron — forest native plants of the Darjeeling Himalayan hill region, Sikkim region, and other neighbouring regions. Also, several exotic plants are preserved. The Cacti and Succulent collection of 150 species is displayed in the Conservatory. The collection of native Orchids from the Singalila Ridge in present-day Singalila National Park is rare and notable.

The Indian Botanical Garden Network's Garden code ascribed for this garden is WB-DBG.

Orchids

See also
List of botanical gardens
Padmaja Naidu Himalayan Zoological Park
Rock Garden, Darjeeling
Singalila National Park

References
Places of Interest in Darjeeling, Darjeelingnews.net. URL accessed on 8 May 2006.

External links
Indian Botanic Gardens Network
About Lloyd's Botanical Garden

Tourist attractions in Darjeeling
Botanical gardens in India
Protected areas of West Bengal
1878 establishments in India
Protected areas established in the 1870s